Impact Fighting Championships (Impact FC) was an Australian mixed martial arts (MMA) promotion.  The promotion held two of three planned events in July 2010 featuring veteran fighters of Ultimate Fighting Championship and Pride Fighting Championships.  Impact FC was financed by Australian concert promoter Andrew McManus and created, organized, and produced by Brazilian promoter Tom Huggins, who helped promote Elite Xtreme Combat, Extreme Cagefighting, Bitetti Combat, and many other MMA events.

The promoters planned to put on three events in a single month in order gauge the interest of Australian fans to mixed martial arts. The first event, held on 10 July 2010 was expected to have a crowd over 1000 in the arena and be broadcast to a world-wide audience of 2.5 million. Following the second event controversy arose over payments to the fighters participating in the event. The fighters had left the arena following the show and traveled home without being paid for the event, going against many boxing and MMA commissions rules, though Thomas Huggins did directly contact the commission to notify them of Andrew McManus' failure to pay fighters as the licensed promoter, before any fighters left however the Commission said it had no power to force McManus to pay. Some fighters did receive partial payments in later weeks, but many were reporting they had gone unpaid. Huggins who had created the event had intended it to be a larger series of fights functioning as a collective of promoters licensing and sharing the Brand in many territories and had recruited local promoters around the world to work under this banner, however after McManus' failure to pay fighters Huggins and the other promoters felt the brand was effectively ruined and had to abandon it.

List of events

Impact FC 1

Impact FC 1 - The Uprising: Brisbane was held on 10 July 2010 at the Brisbane Entertainment Centre in Brisbane, Australia.

Background
Big John McCarthy, former head referee for the UFC, was the referee for the Uprising series.

Dylan Andrews was rumored to fight Steven Kennedy, but it was never officially scheduled.

Luis Dutra Jr. was forced off the card because he separated his biceps. Ben Mortimer was Luis Dutra's replacement.

A hand injury to Felise Leniu and illness of Brad Morris left Bira Lima and Jeff Monson without opponents and they fought each other.

Results
Welterweight bout:  Karo Parisyan vs.  Ben Mortimer
Parisyan defeated Mortimer via submission (rear naked choke) at 4:18 of the second round.
Catchweight (160 lb) bout:  Tom Waters vs.  Jacob Mahony
Waters defeated Mahony via TKO (punches) at 1:38 of the second round.
Heavyweight bout:  Fabio Fernandes vs.  Api Hemara
Fernandes defeated Hemara via submission (rear naked choke) at 3:58 of the first round.
Lightweight bout:  Thiago Meller vs.  Jai Bradney
Meller defeated Bradney via submission (guillotine) at 1:32 of the first round.
Welterweight bout:  Brian Ebersole vs.  Carlos Newton
Ebersole defeated Newton via unanimous decision.
Heavyweight bout:  Rameau Thierry Sokoudjou vs.  Joaquim Ferreira
Sokoudjou defeated Ferreira via TKO (punches) at 1:20 of the first round.
Heavyweight bout:  Jeff Monson vs.  Bira Lima
Monson defeated Lima via unanimous decision.
Heavyweight bout:  Josh Barnett vs.  Geronimo dos Santos
Barnett defeated dos Santos via TKO (punches) at 2:35 of the first round.

Impact FC 2
Impact FC 2 - The Uprising: Sydney was held on 18 July 2010 at the Sydney Entertainment Centre in Sydney, Australia.

Background
Big John McCarthy was the referee for the series.

Geronimo dos Santos vs. Josh Barnett and Brian Ebersole vs. Carlos Newton from Impact FC 1 - The Uprising: Brisbane were replayed during the broadcast of this card.

Bob Sapp was pulled from this event due to a dispute with Impact FC.

Fight Card
Heavyweight bout:  Ken Shamrock vs.  Pedro Rizzo
Rizzo defeated Shamrock via TKO (leg kicks and punches) at 3:33 of the first round.
Welterweight bout:  Paul Daley vs.  Daniel Acacio
Daley defeated Acacio via submission (elbow) at 1:15 of the third round.
Super Heavyweight bout:  Soa Palelei vs.  Brad Morris
Palelei defeated Morris via submission (americana) at 4:20 of the first round.
Middleweight bout:  Paulo Filho vs.  Denis Kang
Filho and Kang fought to a draw (split) at 5:00 of the third round. The judges scored the fight 29-28, 27-30 and 29-29.
Middleweight bout:  Murilo Rua vs.  Jeremy May
Rua defeated May via submission (guillotine choke) at 4:12 of the first round.
Middleweight bout:  Murilo Bustamante vs.  Jesse Taylor
Taylor defeated Bustamante via TKO (verbal tap) at 2:10 of the second round.
Heavyweight bout:  Peter Graham vs.  Jim York
York defeated Graham via submission (rear-naked choke) at 3:44 of the first round.
Light Heavyweight bout:  Glover Teixeira vs.  Marko Peselj
Teixeira defeated Peselj via TKO (punches) at 3:01 of the first round.
Lightweight bout:  Richie Vaculik vs.  Glenn Taylor-Smith
Vaculik defeated Taylor-Smith via submission (rear-naked choke) at 4:16 of the second round.
Welterweight bout:  Shane Nix vs.  Manuel Rodriguez
Rodriguez defeated Nix via technical submission (north-south choke) at 4:22 of the first round.

References

External links
 Impact FC at Sherdog.com
Impact FC - The Uprising - Brisbane Event at ImpactFC.au.com
Official Fight Card for The Uprising - Brisbane
Impact FC 1 at Sherdog.com
Impact FC 1 results from MMAJunkie.com

Australian companies disestablished in 2012
Mixed martial arts organizations
Mixed martial arts in Australia
Australian companies established in 2010